Price Township may refer to:

 Price Township, Rockingham County, North Carolina, in Rockingham County, North Carolina
 Price Township, Monroe County, Pennsylvania

Township name disambiguation pages